Suchedniów  is a town in Skarżysko County, Świętokrzyskie Voivodeship, Poland, with 9,067 inhabitants (2004). It is the seat of the urban-rural district Gmina Suchedniów.

References

Cities and towns in Świętokrzyskie Voivodeship
Skarżysko County
Kielce Governorate
Kielce Voivodeship (1919–1939)